Mormon Lake is a populated place situated in Coconino County, Arizona, south of the eponymous lake.

Mormon Lake, and nearby Lakeview, were developed along Mormon Lake during wetter years when the lake was higher. Various homes have docks far from the current shoreline. This community is built around Mormon Lake Lodge, which originally was on the lake, but now relies on a fishing pond located adjacent to the Lodge.

Although at times confused with the neighboring community of Lakeview, a 1966 GNIS Board Decision clarified that they are separate, distinct communities, located one mile apart. The question has recently become more difficult as Mormon Lake has a post office, while Lakeview does not, thus Lakeview residents have a Mormon Lake address.

Demographics

References

External links
 
 Mormon Lake Lodge

Populated places in Coconino County, Arizona